La Salle Street Bridge may refer to:

 La Salle Street Bridge (Chicago, Illinois)
 La Salle Street Bridge (South Bend, Indiana), a site on the U.S. National Register of Historic Places